is a Japanese football player. She plays for Nojima Stella. She played for Japan national team.

Club career
Kuno was born in Fujisawa on December 27, 1989. After graduating from Musashigaoka College, she joined INAC Kobe Leonessa in 2010. She moved to Iga FC Kunoichi in 2012. She plays 70 matches in L.League. In 2018, she moved to Nojima Stella Kanagawa Sagamihara.

National team career
In March 2013, Kuno was selected Japan national team for 2013 Algarve Cup. At this competition, on March 6, she debuted against Norway.

National team statistics

References

External links

Nojima Stella Kanagawa Sagamihara

1989 births
Living people
Association football people from Kanagawa Prefecture
Japanese women's footballers
Japan women's international footballers
Nadeshiko League players
INAC Kobe Leonessa players
Iga FC Kunoichi players
Nojima Stella Kanagawa Sagamihara players
Women's association football goalkeepers